Erhai or Er Lake, is an alpine fault lake in Dali City, Dali Prefecture, Yunnan province, China.  Erhai was also known as Yeyuze or Kunming Lake in ancient times.

Etymology
The character "洱" (er) does not have the same meaning as ear (耳). During the Han to Tang dynasty, there was an ancient ethnic named Kunming Yi or Kunming Barbarian lived in the neighbouring region of Erhai lake. Therefore, the lake was also called "Kunming Lake". The Kunming Yi has another name Kun-mi. In the following time, Chinese literature recorded the name "昆弥" as "昆弭" (Kun-mi) that "弭" is a rebus of "弥". And the name of the lake was also be changed to the character "渳" (mi) which has a water-meaning radical attached to it. Fang Guoyu believe the name "洱" (er) was simplified from "渳", after that the name "Erhai" continues to this day.

In the Bai language Dali dialect, the "lower" is also pronounced .

Geography

The lake serves as a backdrop to all of Dali City and sandwiches Dali Town in the west against the Cang Mountain. The lake's head is at Shangguan Town, its northern extremity, and its southernmost point is at Xiaguan Town.  The lake receives water from the Miju and Mici Rivers in the north, the Bolou River in the east, and smaller streams from the Cang Mountains in the west. Yangbi River, to the south, is the lake's outlet and eventually flows into the Lancang River (Mekong River).

Attractions
The lakeshore can be explored by hiking. Highlights include Erhai Park and the Butterfly Springs on the Western bank. Islands on the lake – including Guanyin Ge, Jinsuo Island, Nanzhao Folklore Island and Xiaoputuo Island – are also available for visits.

The lake is an important food source for the local people (Bais), who are famous for their fishing method: their trained cormorants catch fish and return them to fishmongers. The birds are prevented from swallowing their fish by rings fixed around their neck.

Biodiversity
There is, or was, a rich biodiversity in Erhai. It is one of three major Yunnan lakes with a high number of endemics, the two other being Fuxian and Dian (Dianchi). Of the 23 fish species and subspecies known from Erhai, 8 are endemic: Cyprinus barbatus, C. daliensis, C. longipectoralis, C. megalophthalmus, Paracobitis erhaiensis, Poropuntius daliensis (syn. Barbodes daliensis), P. exiguus (syn. B. exigua) and Zacco taliensis (syn. Schizothorax taliensis). Among these, only C. barbatus and C. longipectoralis have been recorded since the year 2000; the remaining have not been recorded in decades and are likely extinct. A few of the non-endemic natives have also been extirpated from the lake. In contrast, the lake is now home to more than 10 introduced fish species.

A few native hydrophytes have also disappeared from the lake.

The lake used to be a royal deer ranch for the Nanzhao Kingdom.

External links

Google Earth view

References 

 Erhai Lake on en.chinaculture.org

Lakes of Yunnan
Tourist attractions in Yunnan
Geography of Dali Bai Autonomous Prefecture